Brendan Anthony McElholm (born 7 July 1982) is a Northern Irish footballer who plays as a central defender.

Club career
Born in Omagh, Northern Ireland, McElholm began his senior career at Leyton Orient, after playing in the club's academy. In August 2001, McElholm joined Chelmsford City on loan for a month. On 18 January 2002, McElholm was released from his contract at Leyton Orient, after making 17 Football League appearances. Following his release from Leyton Orient, McElholm signed for Omagh Town. McElholm has also played for local Omagh clubs Strathroy Harps and Tummery Athletic.

International career
McElholm has represented Northern Ireland at under-16 and under-18 levels.

References

1982 births
Living people
Association football defenders
People from Omagh
Association footballers from Northern Ireland
Northern Ireland youth international footballers
Leyton Orient F.C. players
Chelmsford City F.C. players
Omagh Town F.C. players
English Football League players
Football managers from Northern Ireland